Blanca Cerón Perín (born August 11, 1974 in Salamanca, Castile-Leon) is a former freestyle swimmer from Spain, who competed for her native country at the 1996 Summer Olympics in Atlanta, Georgia. There she was eliminated in the qualifying heats of the 50 m freestyle, and the 4x100 m freestyle relay.

References

 Spanish Olympic Committee

1974 births
Living people
Spanish female freestyle swimmers
Olympic swimmers of Spain
Swimmers at the 1996 Summer Olympics
Mediterranean Games gold medalists for Spain
Mediterranean Games medalists in swimming
Swimmers at the 1997 Mediterranean Games